Kurt Saxon (born Donald Eugene Sisco; March 6, 1932 – August 16, 2021) was an American writer, radio host, survivalist and the author of The Poor Man's James Bond, a series of books on improvised weapons and munitions.

History
During the 1960s, Saxon drifted into and out of several political organizations and new religious movements, including the American Nazi Party, the John Birch Society, the Minutemen, and the Church of Scientology.  In August 1970, he appeared before a Senate Investigations subcommittee holding hearings on bombings and terrorism.  According to newspaper accounts, he suggested police and "concerned citizens" use bombs to wipe out "leftists," and recommended that student demonstrators be machine-gunned in the streets.

By the early 1970s he came to reject the political and religious groups of the 1960s, and began writing on homesteading and preparedness issues. He claims to have coined the term "survivalism" to refer to making preparations for a future collapse of society and/or a major disaster.

Saxon claimed that David Letterman had once invited him to appear on his show to demonstrate recipes from his book Granddad’s Wonderful Book of Chemistry, but later cancelled Saxon's appearance after a rehearsal went badly.

In the early 1990s, Saxon had a shortwave radio program over WRNO, New Orleans, Louisiana.

Books and periodicals
Saxon is the author, under his birth name "Don Sisco," of The Militant's Formulary.  After his legal name change to Kurt Saxon, he authored the biker book Wheels of Rage, a partially fictitious, but mostly factual account of the San Fernando, California based Iron Cross M.C., an Outlaw motorcycle club; the Poor Man's James Bond series of books on improvised weaponry; and Granddad's Wonderful Book of Chemistry as well as Granddad's Wonderful Book of Electricity, which are compilations of several out of print hobbyist booklets on home brew chemistry and electronics projects.

In 1976 he began publishing The Survivor to celebrate forgotten pioneer skills. These newsletters combined Saxon's articles with reprints of articles on 19th century technology of interest to the survivalist movement. He later compiled the material into a series of books by the same name.

As his own publisher, Saxon advertised his work in such publications as the Berkeley Barb.

During the early 1990s when the American militia movement was at its peak in the United States, Saxon published a short-lived magazine called U.S. Militia.

Saxon also wrote at least one article for Mel Tappan's P.S. Letter.

Reception
From his earliest works, Saxon's writing has been cited and recommended in more mainstream publications. How to Cut Your Food Bill by Half or More was acknowledged in both survivalist and money management fields. His 1976 book Medicines Like Granddad Used to Make was included in a U.S. Department of Health bibliography of medical history.

Selected works

Books
 The Militant's Formulary. Atlan Formularies, 1971. 
Published under Saxon's birth name, Don Sisco. 
 The Poor Man's James Bond: The Complete "Militant's Formulary" and Much, Much More. Atlan Formularies, 1972.
 How to Cut Your Food Bill by Half or More (City Survival During the Famine to Come). Atlan Formularies, 1973. [2nd ed.]
 The Instant Who's Who in the Bible. Atlan Formularies, 1974.
 Keeping Score on Modern Prophets. Alpena, AR: Atlan Formularies, 1974.
 The Poor Man's James Bond. Atlan Formularies, 1973. [4th ed.]
 Wheels of Rage: The Story of the Iron Cross Motorcycle Club. Atlan Formularies, 1974.
 Fireworks & Explosives Like Granddad Used to Make. Atlan Formularies, 1975.
 Granddad’s Wonderful Book of Chemistry. Eureka, CA: Atlan Formularies, 1975.
 Bar Drinks and Booze Like Granddad Used to Make. Atlan Formularies, 1976.
 Liquors and Soda Fountain Drinks Like Granddad Used To Make . Atlan Formularies, 1976.
 Medicines Like Granddad Used to Make. Atlan Formularies, 1976.
Reprint of the Medical department section of Dr. Chase's Recipes; or, Information for Everybody, by A. W. Chase, and of selections from Dick’s Encyclopaedia of Practical Receipts and Processes, by W. B. Dick. Published in 1872 by Dick & Fitzgerald in New York, now with a new foreword by Kurt Saxon.
 Old Time Home Food Processing For Fun and Profit. Eureka, CA: Atlan Formularies, 1977.
 Survival Foods, Plus. Eureka, CA:  Atlan Formularies, 1977.
 Classic Ghosts and Vampires. 1978.
"Dedicated to Stanton Zaharoff La Vey."
 Root-Rot: Kurt Saxon's Answer to Alex Haley. Alpena, AR: Atlan Formularies, 1978.
Critique of Alex Haley's book and TV series Roots Street Fighting: America's Martial Art. El Dorado, AK: Desert Publications, 1979. .
Published under the pseudonym "George Carpenter".
 Granddad’s Wonderful Book of Electricity. Atlan Formularies, 1980.
 The New Improved Poor Man's James Bond. Atlan Formularies, 1988. [Revised ed.]
 The Poor Man's James Bond, Vol. 1. El Dorado, AR: Desert Publications, 1991. [Revised ed.]
 Granddad's Wonderful Book of Magic. Alpena, AR: Atlan Formularies, 2003. .
 Granddad's Wonderful Book of Toys. Atlan Formularies. [Undated.]

Book contributions
 "Investing in Survival." In: Black, Bob. Rants & Incendiary Tracts: Voices of Desperate Illumination, 1558-Present. Amok Press, Loompanics Unlimited, 1988. pp. 186-191.

Periodicals
 Shoestring Entrepreneur. "Kurt Saxons Journal of Home Business." Formerly The Survivor.
 vol. 1, no. 1 (1993)
 vol. 1, no. 2 (1994)
 The Survivor. .
 vol. 1, no. 1-12 (1976)
 vol. 2, no. 1-12 (1977)
 vol. 3, no. 1-12 (1978)
 vol. 4, no. 1-12 (1979)
 vol. 5, no. 1-12 (1981)
 vol. 6, no. 1-12 (1988)
 vol. 7, no. 1-12 (1988)
 vol. 8, no. 1-12 (1992)
 vol. 9, no. 1-12
 vol. 10, no. 1-12
 The Poor Man's Armorer. "The only magazine of improvised weaponry." .
 vol. 1, no. 1-4 (1978)
vol. 2, no. 1-4 (1979-1981)
 vol. 3, no. 1-4 (1983-1985)
 U.S. Militia. "The only magazine for community defense." .
 vol. 1, no. 1 (1993)
 vol. 1, no. 2 (1993)
 vol. 1, no. 3 (1993)
 vol. 1, no. 4 (1994)
 The Weaponeer. .
 Full collection (1984)

Articles
 "Survival is Looking After #1." 1976.
 "Friends or Allies: Choice for Survival." 1977.
 "Survival and the Paranoid." 1977.
 "The Coming Warlords." 1978.
 "The Killer Caravans." 1979.
 "Roadblocks." 1979.
 "Survival Thinking." 1979.
 "Investment in Survival." 1980.
 "What is a Survivalist?" 1980.
 "Boone County: Shangri-La of the Ozarks." 1981.
 "Fear in the City." 1981.
 "How Not to Survive." 1981.
 "Script Outline for 'Bugout.'" 1981.
 "Survival School." The Survivor, Vol. 5, 1981.
 "Warnings from the Past." 1981.
 "You Can't Trust a 'Patriot'." 1995.
 "A Technology for Survival." Mel Tappan's Personal Survival Letter. 1996. [Revised ed.].

See also
Retreat (survivalism)
Survivalism
James Wesley Rawles
Ragnar Benson

References

Further reading
 Heard, Alex. "Browsing Through Bilge."Washington Post, 16 June 1991. Archived from the original.
 Larabee, Ann. The Wrong Hands: Popular Weapons Manuals and their Historic Changes to Democratic Society. Oxford University Press, 2015.
 Toy, Eckard. "'Promised Land' or Armageddon? History, Survivalists, and the Aryan Nations in the Pacific Northwest." Montana: The Magazine of Western History, Vol. 36, No. 3, Summer 1986, pp. 80–82. .
 Walker, Jesse. "What Do You Get if You Cross Red Dawn with a Cooking Show?"Reason'', 20 July 2018. Archived from the original.

External links
 Kurtsaxon.com Official website (archived)
 Survivalplus.com Commercial website (archived)
 Kurt Saxon's Video Tape Special, Vol. 1

1932 births
2021 deaths
Survivalists
American Nazi Party members
American neo-Nazis
American atheists
People from Boone County, Arkansas
John Birch Society members
American male writers
American critics of Islam